The Loire 102 was a 1930s French flying boat designed as a mail plane by Loire Aviation.

Development
The Loire 102 was designed to operate as a mailplane on the South Atlantic route between West Africa and Brazil. The prototype (registered F-AOVV and named Bretagne) first flew on 12 May 1936. It was a flying boat with a two step hull on top was a superstructure with a control cabin and crew compartments. In the forward hull was a cabin for four passengers, and to the rear were holds for mail, baggage and other cargo. It had a high braced wing on top of the wing was four Hispano-Suiza 12Xirs in tandem pairs (in tractor/pusher configuration). It originally had twin vertical tail surfaces but these were replaced with a single large fin and rudder. The aircraft had severe vibration problems which could not be fixed and Bretagne was scrapped in 1938 without going into service.

Specifications

See also

References

Bibliography

 

102
1930s French mailplanes
Flying boats
Four-engined push-pull aircraft
High-wing aircraft
Aircraft first flown in 1936